Franklin Degaulle Tebo Uchenna (born 15 January 2000) is a Nigerian professional footballer who plays as a centre-back for Häcken.

Career
Tebo Uchenna is a product of the youth academies of FC Digital Foot, Waco Academy and Abuja before beginning his senior career with Nasarawa United in 2019. On 7 August 2021, he transferred to the Swedish club Häcken. He made his professional debut with Häcken in a 1–1 Allsvenskan tie with Hammarby on 26 September 2021. Originally signed on loan, Häcken activated the buyout clause in the winter of 2022.

International career
Tebo Uchenna represented the Nigeria national team in a friendly 4–0 loss to Mexico on 4 July 2021, coming on as a substitute in the 66th minute.

References

External links
 
 

2000 births
Living people
People from Abuja
Nigerian footballers
Nigeria international footballers
Nasarawa United F.C. players
BK Häcken players
Nigeria Professional Football League players
Allsvenskan players
Association football defenders
Nigerian expatriate footballers
Nigerian expatriate sportspeople in Sweden
Expatriate footballers in Sweden